Pandit Wamanrao Sadolikar (16 September 1907 – 25 March 1991) was a Hindustani classical vocalist of the Jaipur-Atrauli Gharana founded by his guru, Utd. Alladiya Khan.

Early life
Pt. Wamanrao Sadolikar was born into a family of music lovers in Kolhapur. As a teenager, he studied classical music under Pt. V. D. Paluskar of the Gwalior Gharana.

Career
Sadolikar's career put him into many roles on the stages of Marathi Natya Sangeet, as a singer-actor, a music director and a director. He also had several film appearances. He studied music under Utd. Bhurji Khan and Utd. Alladiya Khan, and he instructed his brother, Madhukar Sadolikar, his daughter Smt. Shruti Sadolikar-Katkar, and Smt. Manjiri Kavre-Alegaonkar.

Awards and recognition
 1938 - Sangeet Praveen by Gandharva Mahavidyalaya, Lahore.
 ITC SRA Fellowship
 Balgandharv Suvarna Padak by the Marathi Natya Parishad.

References

1907 births
1991 deaths
Hindustani singers
People from Kolhapur
20th-century Indian singers
Singers from Maharashtra